Paopi 26 - Coptic Calendar - Paopi 28

The twenty-seventh day of the Coptic month of Paopi, the second month of the Coptic year. On a common year, this day corresponds to October 24, of the Julian Calendar, and November 6, of the Gregorian Calendar. This day falls in the Coptic season of Peret, the season of emergence.

Commemorations 

 The martyrdom of Saint Macarius, the Bishop of Edkow

References 

Days of the Coptic calendar